USS Stickleback (SS-415), a , was named for the stickleback, a small scaleless fish.

Construction and launch

Her keel was laid down on 1 March 1944 by the Mare Island Navy Yard of Vallejo, California.  She was launched on 1 January 1945 sponsored by Mrs. John O.R. Coll, and commissioned on 29 March 1945.

World War II

Stickleback completed outfitting on 26 May and held her shakedown cruise off the California coast. She reported to Commander, Submarines, Pacific Fleet, for duty on 21 June. More modern equipment was installed at Pearl Harbor; and, on 2 August, she arrived at Guam, where she held sea trials for a few more days.  She began her first war patrol on 6 August when she departed for the Sea of Japan. She arrived there the following week and began patrolling. However, the atomic bombs had been dropped on Hiroshima and Nagasaki and it was believed the war would end shortly.

Stickleback had only been in the patrol area for two days when the cease-fire order was passed. They were taken on board for 18 hours, given food, water, medical treatment, and set afloat again a short distance from one of the Japanese islands.

Stickleback returned to Guam on 9 September and sailed for the United States the next day. She arrived at San Francisco, California, on 28 September as a unit of Admiral William F. Halsey's Third Fleet. The submarine participated in the Navy Day celebration in October and, on 2 January 1946, made a voyage to Pearl Harbor. She was decommissioned, on 26 June 1946, at Mare Island and attached to the Pacific Reserve Fleet.

Korean War

Stickleback was recommissioned on 6 September 1946 and served at San Diego, California as a training ship until entering the Mare Island Naval Shipyard on 6 November 1952 for conversion to a snorkel (GUPPY IIA) type submarine. The vessel was back at sea on 26 June 1953 and joined Submarine Squadron 7 at Pearl Harbor.

Stickleback supported the United Nations forces in Korea from February to July 1954 when she returned to Pearl Harbor.

Foundering

For the next four years, the submarine participated in training operations and the development of both defensive and offensive submarine tactics. On 28 May 1958, Stickleback was participating in an antisubmarine warfare exercise with the destroyer escort  and a torpedo retriever in the Hawaiian area.  The exercises continued into the afternoon of the next day when the submarine completed a simulated torpedo run on Silverstein. As Stickleback was going to a safe depth, she lost power and broached approximately  ahead of the destroyer escort. Silverstein backed full and put her rudder hard left in an effort to avoid a collision but holed the submarine on her port side.

The rescue ships put lines around her, but compartment after compartment flooded and, at 18:57 on 29 May 1958, Stickleback sank in 1,800 fathoms (3,300 m) of water.

Stickleback was struck from the Naval Vessel Register on 30 June 1958.

Stickleback was one of four United States Navy submarines lost since the end of World War II.

Sonar images of her wreckage was made public in March 2020.

Awards

Asiatic-Pacific Campaign Medal
World War II Victory Medal
Navy Occupation Medal with "ASIA" clasp
National Defense Service Medal
Korean Service Medal
United Nations Service Medal

See also
 List of lost United States submarines

References

External links 
On Eternal Patrol: USS Stickleback
Loss of the Stickleback SS-415 A crewmember's account.

 

Balao-class submarines
World War II submarines of the United States
Cold War submarines of the United States
Ships sunk in collisions
Lost submarines of the United States
Shipwrecks of Hawaii
Ships built in Vallejo, California
1945 ships
Maritime incidents in 1958
1958 in Hawaii
Ships sunk with no fatalities